Zvyozdny (masculine), Zvyozdnaya (feminine), or Zvyozdnoye (neuter) may refer to:
Zvyozdnoye Municipal Okrug, a municipal okrug of Moskovsky District of Saint Petersburg, Russia
Zvyozdny (inhabited locality) (Zvyozdnaya, Zvyozdnoye), name of several inhabited localities in Russia
Zvyozdnaya, a station of the St. Petersburg Metro, St. Petersburg, Russia
Zvyozdny, Chukotka Autonomous Okrug, an abandoned settlement on Wrangel Island.

See also
Star City (disambiguation)
Zvyozdny gorodok (disambiguation)